Romain Franco (born 5 June 1998) is a French rugby league footballer who last played as a er for the Saint-Estève Catalan in the Elite One Championship.

In 2021 he made his Catalans debut in the Super League against Hull Kingston Rovers.

References

External links
Catalans Dragons profile

1998 births
Living people
AS Saint Estève players
Catalans Dragons players
French rugby league players
Rugby league wingers
Spain national rugby league team players